Lycodryas is a genus of snakes in the family Pseudoxyrhophiidae. The genus contains ten species, eight of which are endemic to the island of Madagascar, and two to the Comoros Islands. All of the species are harmless to humans.

Species
The following ten species are recognized as being valid.
Lycodryas carleti (Domergue, 1995)
Lycodryas citrinus (Domergue, 1995)
Lycodryas cococola  Hawlitschek, Nagy & Glaw, 2012 
Lycodryas gaimardii (Schlegel, 1837)
Lycodryas granuliceps (Boettger, 1877)
Lycodryas guentheri (Boulenger, 1896)
Lycodryas inopinae (Domergue, 1995)
Lycodryas inornatus (Boulenger, 1896)
Lycodryas maculatus  (Günther, 1858)  - spotted tree snake
Lycodryas pseudogranuliceps (Domergue, 1995)

Nota bene: A binomial authority in parentheses indicates that the species was originally described in a genus other than Lycodryas.

References

Further reading
Günther A (1879). "On Mammals and Reptiles from Johanna, Comoro Islands". Annals and Magazine of Natural History, Fifth Series 3: 215–219. (Lycodryas, new genus, p. 218).

Pseudoxyrhophiidae
Reptiles of Madagascar
Snake genera
Taxa named by Albert Günther